Nick Freeman (born 7 November 1995) is an English professional footballer who plays for Wycombe Wanderers. Freeman plays as a midfielder.

Career
Freeman began his career with non-league sides Histon, Hemel Hempstead Town and Biggleswade Town before having a successful trial at League Two side Wycombe Wanderers in July 2016. He made his professional debut for the Chairboys on 13 August 2016 in a 2–1 victory against Grimsby Town.

His full debut for Wycombe came August 2016 in a 0–0 draw against Blackpool, and scored his first professional goal in the 3–0 EFL Trophy win over West Ham in October 2016, before moving out to Wealdstone on loan.

Able to operate on either flank, Freeman enjoyed more regular first-team football with Wycombe Wanderers in 2017/18, scoring his first EFL goal against Notts County, and would go on to score three more times and contribute two assists in 34 appearances as Wycombe Wanderers earned promotion to League One.

In September 2019 he signed a three-year contract with Wycombe.

On 18 January 2021, Freeman joined League Two side Leyton Orient on loan for the remainder of the 2020-21 season.

Career statistics

Honours
Wycombe Wanderers
EFL League One play-offs: 2020

References

External links

1995 births
Living people
English footballers
People from Stevenage
Footballers from Hertfordshire
Association football midfielders
Histon F.C. players
Hemel Hempstead Town F.C. players
Biggleswade Town F.C. players
Wycombe Wanderers F.C. players
Wealdstone F.C. players
Leyton Orient F.C. players
English Football League players
National League (English football) players
Southern Football League players